Chloe Elizabeth Price is a fictional character from the Life Is Strange video game series published by Square Enix. Created by French developer Dontnod Entertainment, she first appears in the 2015 video game Life Is Strange and its prequel Life Is Strange: Before the Storm as a main protagonist. She is portrayed by actresses Ashly Burch and Rhianna DeVries. The character has received a generally positive reception by video game publications.

Character development 
 
In Before the Storm, Rhianna DeVries, who initially performed motion capture for Chloe, voiced the character, while the original voice actress Ashly Burch served as writing consultant. Instrumentation was employed to represent different sides of the lead character: piano for isolation, electric guitar for rebelliousness, and layered vocals for friendship. Composer Daughter took the script and concept artwork as inspiration. The writers researched memoirs and psychology to understand Chloe's grieving process.

Appearances

In Life Is Strange 
In the fictional city of Arcadia Bay, Max Caulfield realizes that she has the ability to rewind time, and uses her powers to save a girl from being killed by her classmate Nathan Prescott at Blackwell Academy. Max later learns that the girl she saved was her childhood friend Chloe, and the two reunite and spend the day together, before going for a walk near a local lighthouse. Max learns that Chloe's friend Rachel Amber has been missing for several months. Max reveals to Chloe her capacity to travel back in time, and that she has seen visions of a catastrophic tornado destroying the city.

The following day, the two meet at the diner where Chloe's mother Joyce works, and decide to experiment with Max's power at Chloe's secret scrapyard hideout. However, strain from using her powers causes Max to have a nosebleed and faint. Chloe catches her and waits for her to wake up at the junkyard. Upon waking up, Frank Bowers, drug dealer and friend of Rachel, shows up and starts trouble. Chloe takes Max back to Blackwell after Frank leaves.

Max agrees to help Chloe find out what happened to Rachel. They break into the principal's office that night to investigate and enter the school's pool for a swim before evading Blackwell security and fleeing back to Chloe's place. The next morning, they sneak into Frank's motorhome and learn that Rachel was in a relationship with Frank and lied to Chloe about it, causing Chloe to storm off feeling betrayed. Max returns to her dormitory and examines a childhood photo of her and Chloe, but is suddenly transported to the day the picture was taken. Max prevents Chloe's father William from dying in a traffic collision, which inadvertently creates an alternative reality where William is alive but Chloe has been paralyzed from the neck down.

Max uses the photo to undo her decision and return to the present day, restoring Chloe's health. Continuing their investigation, Max and Chloe obtain clues leading them to an abandoned barn owned by Nathan's wealthy and influential family. They discover a hidden bunker containing pictures of Rachel and Max's classmate Kate tied up and intoxicated, with Rachel being buried at Chloe's secret hideout. They hurry back to the scrapyard and find Rachel's grave, much to Chloe's despair. Max follows Chloe to a school party to confront Nathan, believing he will next target fellow student Victoria Chase. They receive a text from Nathan threatening to destroy the evidence, and they rush back to the scrapyard.

All of a sudden, the two are ambushed by Max's teacher Mark Jefferson, who anaesthetises Max and kills Chloe with a shot to the head. Max is kidnapped and held captive in the bunker's "Dark Room", where Jefferson has been drugging and photographing young girls to capture their innocence. Jefferson also reveals that he took Nathan on as a personal student, but killed him before abducting Max due to him giving Rachel an overdose when he tried to mimic Jefferson's work. Max escapes into a photograph and emerges back in time several days, resetting the timeline. She alerts David, getting Jefferson (and Nathan) arrested.

Max is given the opportunity to go to San Francisco and have one of her photos displayed in an art gallery. She calls Chloe from the event and discovers that the storm has reached Arcadia Bay. Max travels back to the time at which she took the gallery photo, which eventually leads her to various alternative realities. Finally reunited, Max and Chloe return to the lighthouse and confront their belief that Max brought the storm into existence by saving Chloe from being shot by Nathan earlier in the week. The only way to prevent it is for Max to go back to that moment via a photo she took and allow Chloe to be killed by Nathan. Max must make a choice: sacrifice Chloe's life to save Arcadia Bay, or sacrifice Arcadia Bay to spare Chloe.

In Life Is Strange: Before the Storm 
Three years before the events of Life is Strange, sixteen-year-old Chloe Price sneaks into a concert at an old mill. Conflict arises with two men inside, but she escapes with the help of schoolmate Rachel Amber. The next day, Chloe and Rachel reunite at Blackwell Academy and decide to ditch class, hitching a ride on a passing train before getting off at a lookout point. They people-watch through a viewfinder and see a man and a woman kiss in the park below, which upsets Rachel. They take a walk to a local scrapyard. Chloe confronts Rachel about her change in mood, but she refuses to answer. When Chloe meets Rachel later, Rachel explains that the man the two saw was her father James, a District Attorney, and that the woman he was kissing was not her mother. Rachel burns a photo of herself and her father, inadvertently causing a wildfire.

The next day, Chloe and Rachel are reprimanded by Principal Wells for ditching school. Chloe hides out at the scrapyard where she finds an old truck in need of repair. She then receives a call from local drug dealer Frank Bowers, who arranges a meeting to discuss settling her debt with him. Chloe agrees to repay him by helping him steal money from her classmate Drew, who owes Frank a large sum. However, Chloe learns that Drew is being violently extorted by another drug dealer, Damon Merrick, and she must decide whether to pay off the dealer with the stolen money to protect Drew or keep it. Later, when a student is unable to participate in the school's theater production of The Tempest due to road closures caused by the wildfire, Chloe reluctantly takes on the role opposite Rachel. After the play, they decide to leave Arcadia Bay with the truck from the scrapyard and return to Rachel's house to pack. Following a confrontation there, James reveals that the woman they saw him kissing was Rachel's biological mother.

Rachel is told that her biological mother, Sera, is a drug addict and that on the day her father kissed her, he had rejected Sera's plea to be reunited with Rachel. Chloe vows to find Sera. Chloe contacts Frank, who agrees to meet her at the scrapyard. She repairs the truck there before Rachel arrives. They are ambushed by Frank and Damon, who stabs Rachel after he realizes she is the district attorney's daughter. Surviving the wound, Rachel recovers at the hospital. Chloe continues the search by investigating James' office for clues about Sera. Chloe learns that James is crooked and has been in contact with Damon, she then finds out that Damon has kidnapped Sera. She races to Damon and Sera's location, and learns that James wanted him to kill Sera. Frank appears and confronts Damon, presumably killing him. Sera is saved, and begs Chloe to never tell Rachel about James' actions, not wanting her relationship with her father to suffer. Back at the hospital, Chloe is faced with a choice: tell Rachel everything or protect her from the truth.

In Farewell 
In the bonus episode of Life Is Strange: Before The Storm, "Farewell", 13-year-old Max Caulfield struggles to break the news to Chloe that her family is moving to Seattle in three days. The two find a recording of their 8-year-old selves speaking of a "buried treasure"- a time capsule they had made five years prior. After finding a "treasure map" and an "amulet" in the attic, Max and Chloe discover the treasure's spot, only to find that Chloe's dad, William, had put their time capsule in a keg, along with a recording of his voice, for safekeeping. Max can choose to either tell Chloe the truth or hide it; regardless of her decision, their plans for the rest of the day are cut short when Chloe's mother, Joyce, returns home with the news of William's death. Max attends William's funeral days later and leaves for Seattle with her parents immediately after, leaving Chloe in grief.

In Life Is Strange 2 
Chloe is mentioned by David while he is talking to Sean Diaz, the main protagonist of the game. If she was sacrificed in the first game, David explains how his stepdaughter was killed by Nathan, which caused him and Joyce to break up some time ago. If Arcadia Bay was sacrificed instead, Chloe (who left town with Max) eventually got back in touch with David and set aside their differences, as alluded to when Chloe finally acknowledged him as her stepfather instead of a derogatory variation of it. She is also seen in two photographs kept in David's trailer; the photo of him, Joyce, and her in front of their house, and one with her and Max sometime after 2013. After his conversation with Sean, David gets a call from Chloe and takes it in the privacy of his trailer. Apparently, she and Max either live in or visit New York and had a bad experience with a local, as David reminds her that "New Yorkers are assholes". David also refers to her as "sweetie", and she and Max had visited him sometime ago.

In Wavelengths 
In the bonus chapter of Life Is Strange: True Colors, "Wavelengths", she is mentioned by Steph Gingrich, the story's main character, who will remember conversations involving her. If the player chose to save Chloe in the first game, while Steph and Mikey are playing a tabletop game, Steph reminiscence their conversations with Chloe, Rachel Amber, Drew North, and Mikey during their days in Arcadia Bay playing tabletop. Which later, Steph commented that she was always jealous between Chloe and Rachel's relationship. When she asks if she ever talked with Chloe, Steph response was she's "off the radar" like her and she was wandering with her other "weirdo" (who is actually Max). If the player chooses to save Arcadia Bay instead, Steph will reminiscence of Mark Jefferson's arrest, police sirens and the discovery of Rachel's body. While playing tabletop with Mikey, Steph will mention about Rachel and Chloe's relationship, how she's jealous of them and later said that the two don't deserve what happened to them. Mikey's also shares his thoughts on both of them.

In Life Is Strange Remastered Collection 
Chloe and Max reappeared in the Life Is Strange Remastered Collection (2022).

In comics 
Chloe Price is one of the lead characters in the Life is Strange comic series, published by Titan Comics. The comic-book serves as a sequel to the video-game, taking place after the "Sacrifice Arcadia Bay" ending of the original game. Originally conceived as a four-issue limited series, the comic has become an ongoing series, exploring Chloe's relationship with Max.

Reception

The character Chloe Price was generally well received by gaming critics. Some gaming reviewers stated that the final episode of Life Is Strange, Polarized, had a "fitting conclusion" to the coming of age story of Chloe Price and that the relationship between the two leads was carried out successfully. Peter Paras of Game Revolution complimented the character beats, particularly the development of Chloe Price, who he said "really comes into her own as [a] fully-formed character." Jeremy Peeples of Hardcore Gamer found Chloe's behaviour as "endearing", claiming that her personality was portrayed with multiple layers. Despite dismissing Chloe early on for being "her same tiresomely combative self," Metro thought Rachel and Chloe's relationship was "the least compelling" aspect of the episode, Wallace thought their "tender moments" were the best parts, and Makedonski said "their struggles, mutual escapism, and sacrifices" provided more than enough investment. Ozzie Mejia of Shacknews relished in Chloe's "genuine growth" contrasting her "fiery spirit". "I'm happy to see a game constructed around a lively young woman who can get a junkyard vehicle functioning, act as an emergency stand-in for Ariel in the "Tempest," and solve a mystery, all while growing up," said The Washington Post, praising the character. Destructoid writer Brett Makedonski said the character characterization was done "to great effect." Metros Juba, on the other hand, was irritated by Wallace's contemptuous remarks regarding Chloe and Rachel's "forced" friendship.

Chloe was ranked as one of the best video game characters of the 2010s by Polygon staff alongside Max Caulfield; writer Colin Campbell praised their relationship, particularly their differences and how they "bring the best out of each other." TheGamer included Chloe Price on their "Iconic Video Game Characters", stating that "there are many characters in the Life Is Strange franchise who are memorable, but the most iconic of them is definitely Chloe Price," while Rachel Weber of GamesRadar ranked Chloe as 41st of their "50 iconic video game characters."

Burch was nominated for a BAFTA Award for Best Performance in a Video Game for her role as Chloe.

Further reading

References 

Attribution

Female characters in video games
Fictional American people in video games
Fictional alcohol abusers
Fictional cannabis users
Fictional characters from Oregon
Fictional characters with paraplegia
Fictional criminals in video games
Fictional drug dealers
Fictional thieves
Fictional unemployed people
Fictional lesbians
LGBT characters in video games
Life Is Strange
Square Enix protagonists
Video game protagonists
Video game characters introduced in 2015
Teenage characters in video games